Shyamlal Chaturvedi (1926 – 7December2018) was a journalist and poet from the Indian state of Chhattisgarh. He was conferred the Padma Shri civilian honour in the field of literature and education, in the year 2018.

Early life
Chaturvedi was born in Kotumi village in Bilaspur district of Chhattisgarh.

Education
Chaturvedi earned a Master's degree through private coaching.

Career
Chaturvedi was a representative of the Navbharat Times and Jansatta, and worked with various other newspapers in Bilaspur district. Later, he became the firstchairperson of the Chhattisgarh Rajbhasha Commission. In a career spanning seven decades, he contributed to folk literature with various creative work, among them Bholwa Bholaram Banis and Parra Bar Lahee were most popular.

On the occasion of Rajyotsav in 2004, Chaturvedi was given the Pandit Sundarlal Sharma Rajya Alankaran honour. He was conferred the Padma Shri civilian honour in the field of literature and education, in the year 2018.

Death
Chaturvedi died of old age on 7December2018.

References

1920 births
2018 deaths
20th-century Indian journalists
21st-century Indian journalists
Indian male journalists
Recipients of the Padma Shri in literature & education